Adenia subsessilifolia is a species of flowering plant in the passionflower family, Passifloraceae, described by Joseph Marie Henry Alfred Perrier de la Bâthie. Adenia subsessilifolia is endemic to southern Madagascar. No subspecies are listed in the Catalogue of Life.

References

subsessilifolia
Taxa named by Joseph Marie Henry Alfred Perrier de la Bâthie